The American boy band New Kids on the Block has released seven studio albums,  seven compilation albums, one EP, twenty-six singles, and five video albums. As of 2005, they had sold more than 17.5 million albums in the United States alone and to date, over 80 million records worldwide.

The New Kids on the Block released their debut single, "Be My Girl", in 1986. It peaked at number 90 on the Hot R&B/Hip-Hop Songs chart. Their first album was released the same year, and although not a big success at the time, it managed to sell three million copies in the United States after almost four years, being certified three times platinum by the RIAA. In 1988, they released their second and most successful album to date, Hangin' Tough, which peaked at number one on the Billboard 200 and sold more than eight million copies in the United States alone. After a Christmas album, they released the song "Step by Step", from the album of the same name; it remains the band's biggest-selling single to date. New Kids on the Block have since released three more studio albums and eight compilations.

Albums

Studio albums

Compilation albums

EPs

Singles

Videography

Home videos

Music videos

 "Tonight" was also released in a black-and-white version. "Dirty Dawg" was also released with the "Dance Mix" version.

Notes

Releases
 A^ Charted as "Let's Try Again"/"Didn't I Blow Your Mind" in the UK and Ireland in October 1990.
 B^ Credited to NKOTB

Chart positions

References

New Kids on the Block
Pop music group discographies